The grey-crowned prinia (Prinia cinereocapilla) is a species of bird in the family Cisticolidae.
It is found in Bhutan, northern India and Nepal.
Its natural habitats are subtropical or tropical dry forest, subtropical or tropical moist shrubland, subtropical or tropical dry lowland grassland, subtropical or tropical seasonally wet or flooded lowland grassland, and arable land.
It is threatened by habitat loss.

Grey-crowned prinia is 11 cm long and weighs 6–8·5 g. A small, neatly proportioned and relatively short-tailed prinia with small and slim bill. In fresh plumage has rufous forehead.

References

grey-crowned prinia
Birds of Nepal
Birds of Bhutan
grey-crowned prinia
Taxonomy articles created by Polbot